"Epitaph for James Smith" is a satirical Scots epitaph written by poet Robert Burns in 1785, and was included in his first publication, the Kilmarnock volume:

LAMENT him, Mauchline husbands a’,	
He aften did assist ye;	
For had ye staid hale weeks awa,	
Your wives they ne’er had miss’d ye.	
 
Ye Mauchline bairns, as on ye press,
To school in bands thegither,	
O tread ye lightly on his grass,—	
Perhaps he was your father!

See also

 Epistle to James Smith
 The Scottish town of Mauchline

References

1785 poems
Poetry by Robert Burns